United Soft Drinks is a producer of soft drinks based in Utrecht in the Netherlands. Their best known-brands are AA Drink, a line of sport drinks, Bar-le-Duc, a line of mineral waters, London, a line of bitter lemonades, Raak, a line of fruit syrups, and the product Kindercola.  The company also produces a number of private label lemonades.

External links
Official website

Companies based in Utrecht (province)